Sandip Gupta (also Sandeep Gupta; born 7 April 1967) is a former Kenyan cricketer. He is a right-handed batsman and a fast bowler, who also a wicket-keeper.

He took part in the 1999 Meril International Tournament, where he helped the Kenyan team to the final where they lost against Zimbabwe, mainly thanks to a century from man-of-the-match Grant Flower. He later took part in the 1999 World Cup, where Kenya lost all their five games and finished bottom of the Group A table.

1967 births
Living people
Kenyan cricketers
Kenya One Day International cricketers
Kenyan Hindus
Cricketers at the 1998 Commonwealth Games
Cricketers at the 1999 Cricket World Cup
Kenyan people of Indian descent
Commonwealth Games competitors for Kenya